Badminton Oceania (BO) is the governing body of badminton in Oceania. It is one of the 5 continental bodies under the flag of the Badminton World Federation (BWF). As of 2017, the confederation has 15 member countries. Papua New Guinea is the newest member, which was granted membership in late 2016.

On the occasion of launching the new logo by Badminton Oceania, the organisation decided to change the name from Oceania Badminton Confederation to Badminton Oceania.

Member associations

 Australia
 Cook Islands
 Fiji
 Guam
 Kiribati
 Nauru
 New Zealand
 Norfolk Island
 Papua New Guinea
 Samoa
 Solomon Islands
 Tahiti
 Tonga
 Tuvalu
 New Caledonia (associated member)
 Northern Mariana (associated member)

Tournament
Oceania Badminton Championships

References

External links
Official website

Badminton organizations
Sports governing bodies in Oceania
Badminton World Federation
Badminton in Oceania